Abdeslam Ouaddou (born 1 November 1978) is a Moroccan former professional footballer who played as a centre-back or defensive midfielder.

Club career
Ouaddou was born in Alnif, Morocco. He started his footballing career quite late, at the age of 21. In the summer of 2001, Ouaddou was signed by newly promoted Premier League club Fulham for £2 million, on a four-year contract. However, Ouaddou did not settle in England and spent the last two years of his contract on loan at Rennes, before joining the French club permanently once his contract expired.

In summer 2006, Ouaddou signed for Olympiacos. After disappointing appearances with the team, he was relegated to the bench. On 7 December 2006, he asked Olympiacos to release him free because he felt homesick and had some family problems. The club's directors agreed and Ouaddou will return to France.

On 1 January 2007, the opening day of the January transfer window, Ouaddou joined Valenciennes FC on a free transfer. After one season with the club however, he transferred to AS Nancy for a fee of £150,000. He was voted the club's best signing for the 2008–09 campaign.

On 30 June 2010, Ouaddou left Nancy after a dispute with the Ligue 1 outfit. He had a deal until 2012 but left after the club decided to sack him for gross misconduct, while the player wanted to cancel his contract.

In 2010, he played for Al-Duhail SC in the Qatar Stars League, eventually winning the league championship.

It was announced on 8 August 2011, that Qatar SC had signed him for a two-year deal. He commented on the move, stating "I'm more than pleased to have extended my stay in the Qatar Stars League and move to another big club". In 2013, he criticized employment conditions in Qatar, stating "When you work in Qatar you belong to someone. You are not free. You are a slave." In November 2012, he left Qatar SC.

On 1 January 2013, he signed a contract with his first professional club AS Nancy to close his career, but two weeks later he announced that he retired from professional football.

International career
Between 2000 and 2009, Ouaddou made 58 appearances for the Morocco national team scoring three goals.

International goals
Scores and results list Morocco's goal tally first, score column indicates score after each Ouaddou goal.

Honours
Fulham
UEFA Intertoto Cup: 2002

Morocco
Africa Cup of Nations runner-up: 2004

References

External links
Abdeslam Ouaddou's profile, stats & pics

1978 births
Living people
People from Errachidia
Association football defenders
Association football midfielders
Association football utility players
Moroccan footballers
Morocco international footballers
Moroccan expatriate footballers
2002 African Cup of Nations players
2004 African Cup of Nations players
2006 Africa Cup of Nations players
2008 Africa Cup of Nations players
Valenciennes FC players
Olympiacos F.C. players
Fulham F.C. players
AS Nancy Lorraine players
Stade Rennais F.C. players
Ligue 1 players
Premier League players
Super League Greece players
Expatriate footballers in Greece
Expatriate footballers in France
Expatriate footballers in England
Expatriate footballers in Qatar
Moroccan expatriate sportspeople in England
Moroccan expatriate sportspeople in France
Moroccan expatriate sportspeople in Greece
Moroccan expatriate sportspeople in Qatar
Footballers at the 2000 Summer Olympics
Olympic footballers of Morocco
Lekhwiya SC players
Qatar Stars League players